was a town located in Kita District, Kagawa Prefecture, Japan.

As of 2003, the town had an estimated to have population of 6,392 and a density of 403.79 persons per km². The total area was 15.83 km².

On January 10, 2006, Aji, along with the town of and Mure (also from Kita District), the towns of Kagawa and Kōnan (both from Kagawa District), and the town of Kokubunji (from Ayauta District), was merged into the expanded city of Takamatsu and no longer exists as an independent municipality.

Aji was the main filming location of a Japanese hit movie Crying Out Love, In the Center of the World. When the movie was filmed, this town was chosen as the location where the protagonists lived in high school days.

External links
 Official website of Takamatsu 
 Official website of Takamatsu 

Dissolved municipalities of Kagawa Prefecture
Takamatsu, Kagawa